Michael Ann Williams (born 1953) is an American Folklorist, recognised for her research into vernacular architecture, particularly in Appalachia.

She is Emeritus Professor of Folklore at Western Kentucky University.

Early life and education 
Williams attended Franklin and Marshall College, Pennsylvania, graduating with a degree in anthropology.

Williams undertook doctoral research at the University of Pennsylvania, achieving a Ph.D. in Folklore and Folklife. Her dissertation supervisor was Don Yoder. Her dissertation formed the basis of her book Homeplace: the social use and meaning of the folk dwelling in southwestern North Carolina (1991).

Career 
Williams was based at Western Kentucky University for her entire teaching career, starting in 1986. In 2004 she became Head of the newly created Department of Folk Studies and Anthropology: a role she continued to serve in until 2017.

Williams also worked on various applied projects with her graduate students, including "an oral history project documenting the former logging town of Ravensford, North Carolina, part of a larger cultural resource documentation effort accompanying a transfer of land from the Great Smoky Mountains National Park to the Eastern Band of Cherokee Indians".

Recognition 
Williams was president of the American Folklore Society between 2014 and 2015.  The title of her presidential address was "After the Revolution: Folklore, History, and the Future of Our Discipline". In 2019, she received the AFS's Kenneth Goldstein Award for Lifetime Academic Leadership.

Williams has also served as Vice president of the Vernacular Architecture Forum.

Selected publications 

 Williams, Michael Ann; Dockery, Carl (1984). Marble & log: the history & architecture of Cherokee County, North Carolina. Murphy, N.C. (205 Peachtree St., Murphy 28906): Cherokee County Historical Museum Council, Division of Archives and History, North Carolina Dept. of Cultural Resources. .
 Williams, Michael Ann (1987). "Rethinking the House: Interior Space and Social Change". Appalachian Journal. 14 (2): 174–182. .
 Williams, Michael Ann (1991). Homeplace : the social use and meaning of the folk dwelling in southwestern North Carolina. Athens: University of Georgia Press. . .
 Williams, Michael Ann (1995). Great Smoky Mountains folklife. Jackson: University Press of Mississippi. . .
 Williams, Michael Ann; Young, M. Jane (1995). "Grammar, Codes, and Performance: Linguistic and Sociolinguistic Models in the Study of Vernacular Architecture". Perspectives in Vernacular Architecture. 5: 40–51. . .
 Williams, Michael Ann; University of California, Berkeley; Center for Environmental Design Research (2000). Mobile/izing spatial scales: the shifting politics of tradititon. Berkeley, CA: IASTE, University of California at Berkeley. .
 Williams, Michael Ann; Morrisey, Larry (2000). "Constructions of Tradition: Vernacular Architecture, Country Music, and Auto-Ethnography". Perspectives in Vernacular Architecture. 8: 161–175. . .
 Williams, Michael Ann (2001). "Vernacular Architecture and the Park Removals: Traditionalization as Justification and Resistance". Traditional Dwellings and Settlements Review. 13 (1): 33–42. .
 Williams, Michael Ann (2005). "Selling Domestic Space: The Boarding House in the Southern Mountains". Perspectives in Vernacular Architecture. 12: 1–10. .
 Williams, Michael Ann (2006). Staging tradition: John Lair and Sarah Gertrude Knott. Urbana, Ill.; Chesham: University of Illinois Press ; Combined Academic [distributor. . .
 Lloyd, Timothy; Williams, Michael Ann (2018-01-01). "A Conversation with Timothy Lloyd". Journal of American Folklore. 131 (521): 272–300. . .
 Williams, M. A. (2020). A Century of Folklore Research and Teaching at Western Kentucky. In P. Sawin & R. L. Zumwalt (Eds.), Folklore in the United States and Canada: An Institutional History (pp. 152–163). Indiana University Press. 
 Williams, Michael Ann (2022-01-01). "Back of Beyond: A Horace Kephart Biography Horace Kephart: Writings". Journal of American Folklore. 135 (535): 120–121. . .

References

External links 
 Michael Ann Williams delivering the 2015 American Folklore Society Presidential Address, "After the Revolution: Folklore, History, and the Future of Our Discipline".

1953 births
Living people
Franklin & Marshall College
Vernacular architecture
University of Pennsylvania School of Arts and Sciences alumni
Western Kentucky University faculty
Presidents of the American Folklore Society